Pelli Peetalu is a 1998 Telugu-language romantic comedy film directed by S. V. Krishna Reddy. It stars Jagapati Babu, Soundarya with music composed by S. V. Krishna Reddy. It is produced by V. B. Rajendra Prasad under the Jagapati Art Pictures banner. The film was recorded as a Super Hit at the box office. Upon release, the film received positive reviews, and remained a musical hit. The film was a remake of the Malayalam film Ee Puzhayum Kadannu (1996), and is also remade in Kannada as Sambhrama (1999).

Plot
Gopi is a simple and self-respect guy, runs a watch shop in his hometown. He loves his neighbor Anjali one that lives with her elder sisters Aswini, Aruna, and their grandmother. She is the only breadwinner of the family and moreover, they are vexed by their stepbrother Raghu (Hemanth). Gopi & Anjali run into each other a few times and they fall in love. However, Anjali backs up due to her unmarried elder sisters. At that point, Gopi takes up her responsibilities and performs dumb Aswini's nuptial with his close friend Brahmaji. Thereafter, he learns Aruna is in love with a guy Ravindra but his greedy mother demands 1 lakh as dowry. Hence, Gopi sells his business and liens his self-respect by accepting a job proposal from shop owner Tatabbai. Just before the wedding, unfortunately, Raghu steals the ornaments. In that quarrel, accidentally Gopi kills Raghu.  Right now, Gopi and Anjali cross many difficulties for the completion of marriage by hiding the truth. Soon after, Gopi surrenders to Police and is sentenced to 5 years. Finally, the movie ends on a happy note with Gopi return  and Anjali giving him a warm welcome.

Cast

 Jagapathi Babu as Gopi
 Soundarya as Anjali
 Chandra Mohan as Chandram
 Kota Srinivasa Rao as Raghavayya
 Tanikella Bharani as Tatabbai
 Sudhakar as Veera Babu
 Brahmaji as Brahmaji
 Raja Ravindra as Ravindra
 Sivaji Raja
 Hemanth as Raghu
 Chittajalu Lakshmipati
 Subbaraya Sharma
 Chitti Babu as a bus conductor
 Mithai Chitti as a vegetable seller
 Uttej
 Sudha as Chandram's wife
 Rajitha as Veera Babu's wife
 Jhansi as Aruna
 Shilpa (Chippy) as Aswini
 Tatineni Rajeswari as Anjali's Mother
 Telangana Shakuntala as Ravindra's Mother
 Nirmalamma as Anjali's grandmother
 Master Anand Vardhan as Cable

Music 

Music was composed by S. V. Krishna Reddy. Lyrics written by Chandrabose. The music released on Music Two Thousand Company. Legendary singer K. S. Chithra has sung five songs for this film.

References 

1998 romantic comedy films
1990s Telugu-language films
1998 films
Films about Indian weddings
Films about women in India
Films directed by S. V. Krishna Reddy
Films scored by S. V. Krishna Reddy
Films shot in Hyderabad, India

Indian romantic comedy films

Telugu remakes of Malayalam films